Holy Ghost Catholic Church, also known as Holy Ghost Mission, is an historic octagon-shaped Roman Catholic church building on the island of Maui, located at 4300 Lower Kula Road in Waiakoa in the Kula district. It was designed by Father James Beissel and built by his parishioners who were Portuguese from the Azores and the Madeira Islands who had come to work on the local sugarcane plantation. The first mass was celebrated in it in 1895. It was consecrated in 1899 by Bishop Gulstan Ropert, the third vicar apostolic of the Vicariate Apostolic of the Sandwich Islands — now the Roman Catholic Diocese of Honolulu.

On April 29, 1983, it was placed on the Hawaii Register of Historic Places and on August 18, 1983, it was placed on the National Register of Historic Places. It may be the only historic octagonal building in Hawaii.

In 1991 the building was closed for a year in order to undergo a major restoration. Holy Ghost Mission is still an active Roman Catholic congregation, which annually at Pentecost celebrates the Portuguese Holy Ghost Festival.

Gallery

See also
 List of Registered Historic Places in Hawaii

References

External links

 Kula Catholic Community website
 Library of Congress page on Local Legacies in Hawaii: Portuguese Holy Ghost Festival and Traditional Practices

Churches on the National Register of Historic Places in Hawaii
Roman Catholic churches in Hawaii
Religious buildings and structures in Maui County, Hawaii
Portuguese immigration to Hawaii
Historic American Buildings Survey in Hawaii
Octagonal churches in the United States
Roman Catholic churches completed in 1894
1895 establishments in Hawaii
National Register of Historic Places in Maui County, Hawaii
Buildings and structures in Kula, Hawaii
19th-century Roman Catholic church buildings in the United States
Hawaii Register of Historic Places